Jeffrey H C Powell (born May 13, 1976) is a Canadian rower. Born in Winnipeg, Manitoba, Powell began rowing in 1996 and is a graduate of the University of Western Ontario. He won the gold medal at both the 2002 and 2003 world championships for Canada's men's eight team in Milan, Italy and Seville, Spain respectively. In 2004 he competed at the Athens Olympics. Jeff is now a father a two girls.

References

1976 births
Living people
Olympic rowers of Canada
Rowers at the 2004 Summer Olympics
Rowers from Winnipeg
Canadian male rowers
World Rowing Championships medalists for Canada